Trzcinica  is a village in the administrative district of Gmina Wielichowo, within Grodzisk Wielkopolski County, Greater Poland Voivodeship, in west-central Poland.

References

Trzcinica